The  is a transportation company in Okayama City, Japan. The private company operates tram lines and bus lines.

The company was founded in 1910, while its first tram line was opened in 1912. This is one of the few Japanese railway operators that maintained their original corporation names from the foundation in Meiji Period. The company is a core member of the Ryōbi Group, another core member being Ryōbi Bus. From October 1, 2006, together with Ryōbi Bus and Shimotsui Dentetsu, another bus company, Okaden introduced Hareca, a smart card ticketing system. They accept PiTaPa and ICOCA as well.

Tram lines
With just 4.7 km in total, the tram lines are known to be one of the shortest in Japan.

Lines
■ Higashiyama Line: Okayama-Ekimae — Yanagawa — Higashiyama
■ Seikibashi Line: Okayama-Ekimae — Yanagawa — Seikibashi (Officially, the section between Okayama-Ekimae and Yanagawa belongs to Higashiyama Line.)

Bus lines
Generally speaking, Okaden operates lines with shorter distances within Okayama City, while Ryōbi Bus operates lines with longer distances. They also operate limousine buses linking Okayama Station and Okayama Airport, while Okaden Express is a highway bus that links Okayama and Kōbe / Kōbe Airport.

Supporting other railway lines
Okaden is known for its active stance to try to support other railway lines, when their operators announced to close them. So far, they have considered supporting 4 lines of Meitetsu (Gifu City Line, Ibi Line, Minomachi Line, and Tagami Line), as well as Hitachi Dentetsu Line, Nankai Kishigawa Line, and Hokkaidō Chihoku Kōgen Railway Furusato Ginga Line. Among them, they succeeded to support Kishigawa Line, now operated by Wakayama Electric Railroad, their subsidiary company.

See also
List of light-rail transit systems

External links 

  

Okayama
Bus companies of Japan
Tram transport in Japan
Transport in Okayama Prefecture